Ridgemark is a census-designated place (CDP) located adjacent to the southeastern edge of Hollister in San Benito County, California, United States.  The community is a private, gated golf development with a golf course and just over 1,000 homes.  Development of the community began in the early 1970s, and the population had reached 3,016 at the time of the 2010 United States Census.

Geography

Climate
This region experiences warm (but not hot) and dry summers, with no average monthly temperatures above 71.6 °F.  According to the Köppen Climate Classification system, Ridgemark has a warm-summer Mediterranean climate, abbreviated "Csb" on climate maps.

Demographics

2010
The 2010 United States Census reported that Ridgemark had a population of 3,016. The racial makeup of Ridgemark was 2,520 (83.6%) White, 23 (0.8%) African American, 14 (0.5%) Native American, 105 (3.5%) Asian, 3 (0.1%) Pacific Islander, 248 (8.2%) from other races, and 103 (3.4%) from two or more races. Hispanic or Latino of any race were 623 persons (20.7%).

The Census reported that 2,980 people (98.8% of the population) lived in households, 36 (1.2%) lived in non-institutionalized group quarters, and 0 (0%) were institutionalized.

There were 1,207 households, out of which 332 (27.5%) had children under the age of 18 living in them, 780 (64.6%) were opposite-sex married couples living together, 88 (7.3%) had a female householder with no husband present, 49 (4.1%) had a male householder with no wife present.  There were 42 (3.5%) unmarried opposite-sex partnerships, and 9 (0.7%) same-sex married couples or partnerships. 244 households (20.2%) were made up of individuals, and 141 (11.7%) had someone living alone who was 65 years of age or older. The average household size was 2.47.  There were 917 families (76.0% of all households); the average family size was 2.84.

The population was spread out, with 620 people (20.6%) under the age of 18, 139 people (4.6%) aged 18 to 24, 529 people (17.5%) aged 25 to 44, 984 people (32.6%) aged 45 to 64, and 744 people (24.7%) who were 65 years of age or older.  The median age was 49.1 years. For every 100 females, there were 93.1 males.  For every 100 females age 18 and over, there were 92.9 males.

The homeowner vacancy rate was 1.7%; the rental vacancy rate was 6.1%.  2,428 people (80.5% of the population) lived in owner-occupied housing units and 552 people (18.3%) lived in rental housing units.

2000
As of the census of 2000, there were 2,741 people, 1,110 households, and 863 families residing in the CDP. The racial makeup of the CDP in 2010 was 73.0% non-Hispanic White, 0.7% non-Hispanic African American, 0.2% Native American, 3.2% Asian, 0.1% Pacific Islander, 0.1% from other races, and 2.0% from two or more races. Hispanic or Latino of any race were 20.7% of the population.

There were 1,110 households, out of which 24.7% had children under the age of 18 living with them, 71.4% were married couples living together, 4.8% had a female householder with no husband present, and 22.2% were non-families. 18.4% of all households were made up of individuals, and 8.9% had someone living alone who was 65 years of age or older.  The average household size was 2.47 and the average family size was 2.78.

In the CDP, the population was spread out, with 20.7% under the age of 18, 3.9% from 18 to 24, 21.3% from 25 to 44, 33.5% from 45 to 64, and 20.6% who were 65 years of age or older.  The median age was 48 years. For every 100 females, there were 93.7 males.  For every 100 females age 18 and over, there were 92.6 males.

The median income for a household in the CDP was $79,057, and the median income for a family was $87,743. Males had a median income of $69,219 versus $38,250 for females. The per capita income for the CDP was $36,966.  About 2.2% of families and 3.5% of the population were below the poverty line, including 5.2% of those under age 18 and 2.7% of those age 65 or over.

Government

Notes

External links
Ridgemark Golf & Country Club

Census-designated places in San Benito County, California
Census-designated places in California